The Al-Iman School is an Islamic school catering for Muslim students. The school, located in Jamaica, Queens, New York, USA, was established in September 1990. Its main benefactor was Grand Ayatollah Abul-Qassim Khoei. Within four years, the school became the first Pre-K through 12 Islamic school in North America. Due to demand, between 1990-94 several grades were added. Al-Iman School is the first Islamic High School to be accepted in the Federal 'Reading First' Program.

English as a second language students
The School employs remedial reading teachers from the Education Department who test, assess and coach students in English language arts and reading in order to integrate them into the mainstream classroom lessons.

Religious observance
On Fridays, Al-Iman School students from grades 1-12 join the rest of the community in Friday prayers. Every morning and afternoon, students assemble in the prayer assembly hall in the school to recite from the Qur'an and also to make small oral presentations to improve verbal skills and delivery in front of an audience. Mid-day adhan is followed by congregational prayers in the assembly hall.

At Al-Iman classes end early, at 2 pm, during Ramadan. All the students are expected to try to read the Qur'an from beginning to end over the lunar month.

Sports
Boys and girls in the same grade play separately. When girls have gym, boys have religion, and vice versa.

Facilities
The Al-Iman School is located at 89-89 Van Wyck Expressway West Service Road in a  building, crowned by the traditional Islamic dome and minaret.

The Imam Al-Khoei Foundation's research library contains more than fifteen thousand volumes, in several languages, on all aspects of Al-Islam, including comparative religion. This reference library is available to the community at large as well as the Al-Iman faculty. The school receives assistance from the State and City Education Department in the form of books and audio-visual equipment for the library.

The 1000-seat congregation hall is regularly used for prayers, celebrations and commemorations. Al-Iman School uses the facility, that has a stage and pillars, for display of exhibits during the science fair, Heritage Day, and for graduation from kindergarten, sixth grade, eighth grade, and high school.

Al-Iman has been dogged by space constraints for some time. A closed-down warehouse adjoining its premises was purchased and plans have been drawn up to erect a four-story extension. The new facility will house a gym and health club facility with an Olympic-size swimming pool available to the community. Two floors of classrooms, laboratories, and administrative offices will be connected to the existing building by a sheltered walkway.

External links
 Official site

References

Islam in New York City
Islamic schools in New York (state)
Private high schools in Queens, New York
Private elementary schools in Queens, New York
Educational institutions established in 1990
Private middle schools in Queens, New York
Jamaica, Queens
1990 establishments in New York City